The 2019–20 Biathlon IBU Cup was a multi-race tournament over a season of biathlon, organised by the International Biathlon Union. IBU Cup is the second-rank competition in biathlon after the Biathlon World Cup. The season started on 25 November 2019 in Sjusjøen, Norway and ended on 8 March 2020 in Minsk-Raubichi, Belarus. The defending overall champions from the 2018–19 Biathlon IBU Cup were Anton Babikov and Victoria Slivko from Russia.

Calendar
Below is the IBU Cup calendar for the 2019–20 season.

Notes
 All European Championships races included in the IBU Cup total score.

IBU Cup podiums

Men

Women

Mixed

Medal table

References

External links
IBU official site

IBU Cup
2019 in biathlon
2020 in biathlon